Philipp Huspek (born 5 February 1991) is an Austrian professional association football player currently playing for Wallern. He plays as a midfielder.

Personal life
His younger brother Felix Huspek is also a football player.

External links

1991 births
Living people
Austrian footballers
Association football midfielders
2. Liga (Austria) players
Austrian Football Bundesliga players
SV Ried players
FC Blau-Weiß Linz players
SV Grödig players
SK Rapid Wien players
LASK players
SK Sturm Graz players
SV Wallern players